Philippe Geubels (born 15 April 1981) is a Flemish stand-up comedian.

Career 

From 2009 till 2018 he was one of the jury members in the De Slimste Mens ter Wereld television quiz show. In 2019, he also appeared as contestant on the show.

In 2013 and 2014 he presented the television show Geubels en de Belgen, a Belgian remake of the British television show John Bishop's Britain. In 2014, he played the role of Danny in the comedy film K3 Dierenhotel.

In 2018, he presented the television show Is er een dokter in de zaal?, a game show about medical topics. In the same year, he also presented the television show Taboe (Dutch for Taboo) in which he explores humor and topics that tend to be taboo in comedy. In 2019, the show was nominated for an International Emmy Award in the category Non-Scripted Entertainment but did not win. The British show The Real Full Monty: Ladies' Night won the award instead.

In 2019, he played the lead role in the television series Geub in which he plays a fictional version of himself. On his 38th birthday, in 2019, he visited Philippe of Belgium, also born on 15 April, in his palace in Brussels.

Filmography

As actor 

 K3 Dierenhotel (2014)
 Geub (2019)

As presenter 

 Geubels en de Belgen (2013, 2014)
 Geubels en de Idioten (2015)
 Is er een dokter in de zaal? (2018)
 Taboe (2018)

As jury member 

 De Slimste Mens ter Wereld (2009 - 2018)

As contestant 

 De Slimste Mens ter Wereld (2019)

References

External links 

 

1981 births
Living people
Belgian stand-up comedians
Flemish television presenters